Georges Chappe (born 5 March 1944) is a retired cyclist from France, who was nicknamed Jojo during his professional career. He was a professional from 1965 to 1975. In 1970 he won the Critérium International. In 1968, Chappe won a stage in the Tour de France, but in 1971 he was the lanterne rouge. He also competed in the team time trial at the 1964 Summer Olympics.

Major results

1963
World amateur championship team time trial (100km) (with Michel Bechet, Marcel-Ernest Bidault and Dominique Motte)
1965
Promotion Pernod
Sanvignes
Plonéour-Lavern
1967
Paris–Camembert
1968
Tour de France:
Winner stage 4
1969
Grand-Bourg
1970
Critérium International
GP Petit Varois
Paris–Camembert
1972
Lamballe
Vailly-sur-Sauldre

References

External links 

Official Tour de France results for Georges Chappe

1944 births
Living people
French male cyclists
Cyclists from Marseille
French Tour de France stage winners
Olympic cyclists of France
Cyclists at the 1964 Summer Olympics
UCI Road World Champions (elite men)